is a Japanese rugby union player who plays as a Fly-half.

References

External links
 

1992 births
Living people
Rugby union fly-halves
Sunwolves players
Japanese rugby union players
Japan international rugby union players
Urayasu D-Rocks players
Yokohama Canon Eagles players